Faithleach of Clontuskert, Irish saint, .

Faithleach was one of the four sons of Fionnlugh mac Olchú, and a brother of Brendan of Clonfert. His other brothers were Domhainghin of Tuaim Múscraighe and Faolán of Ceall Tulach. His associated with Cloontuskert, located in south-east County Galway, is unclear but he may have been its founder or an immediate successor.

External links
 http://www.clontuskert.com/

References

 The Great Book of Irish Genealogies, 729.13, pp. 718–19, volume two, Dubhaltach MacFhirbhisigh; edited, with translation and indices by Nollaig Ó Muraíle, 2003-2004. .
 The Parish of Cloontuskert - Glimpses into its Past, 2009.

Christian clergy from County Galway
6th-century Irish abbots
Medieval Irish saints